Shetab, officially the Interbank Information Transfer Network, is an electronic banking clearance and automated payments system used in Iran. The system was introduced in 2002 with the intention of creating a uniform backbone for the Iranian banking system to handle ATM, EFTPOS and other card-based transactions.

Prior to its introduction, some Iranian banks were issuing cards that only worked on the issuing banks ATMs and POS machines. Since the introduction of Shetab, all banks must adhere to its standards and be able to connect to it. Furthermore, all issued credit or debit cards must be Shetab capable. As of the end of 2017, the Shetab system had 54,300 ATMs connected to it.

History

Shetab was introduced in 2002, and now all card issuing banks in Iran are required to connect to the system. In 2002, when the system was introduced there were at approximately 2.8 million domestic debit cards in circulation, of those approximately 530,000 were capable of using the Shetab system.

In 2005, the government obliged the Central Bank of Iran and the Iranian banks, mostly state owned, to set up all the necessary infrastructures (regulatory, hardware, software) for fully launching e-money in Iran by March 2005. While this plan has not yet fully materialised, local debit/credit cards are now commonplace and have removed the main obstacle to the growth of e-commerce (in the national scale) as well as the full roll out of e-government initiatives. By 2010 it is expected that 12 million cards would be issued, all of which work with the Shetab system.

The Agricultural Bank (Keshavarzi Bank) was the first Iranian bank to connect to the Shetab system. Saman Bank was the first bank to introduce online banking services in Iran. Since, it has been at the forefront of expansion and enhancement of electronic banking.

In 2007, before the imposition of new sanctions against Iran, Tetra-Tech IT Company announced that using Visa and Mastercard is now possible for online sales and in Iranian e-card terminals at shopping malls, hotels, restaurants, and travel agencies for Iranians and foreign tourists. Iran's electronic commerce will reach 10,000 billion rials ($US1 billion) by March 2009.

In 2010 nearly every bank branch in Iran had a Shetab system Connected ATM unit. More than 70% of shops, restaurants and markets are connected to the Shetab system. Many online stores are also linked to the Shetab system., Mobile and SMS Banking are recent additions to the Shetab system.

Connectivity

 In March 2005 agreements were reached between the Iranian Central Bank and Bahrain's ATM network Benefit as well as the United Arab Emirates's UAES to connect their systems to the Shetab network.
 In October 2005, Iran and China linked their banking systems.
 In July 2006 the Shetab system was linked with Qatar's ATM network (NAPS).
 In May 2008, the automated teller machine (ATM) network of Iran has been linked to those in Bahrain, Qatar and Kuwait, enabling customers to have direct access to their accounts from Iran and the Arab countries.
 In December 2016, plans are to link to Japan’s JCB and China’s UnionPay over the short term; and to Visa and Mastercard over the long term.

Members

As of 2020, nearly all Iranian banks and some international banks in Qatar, Kuwait and Bahrain are members of the Shetab System, as follows: 
 1-Bank Sepah
 2-Bank Melli Iran
 3-Bank Keshavarzi Iran
 4-Bank Maskan
 5-Bank Saderat Iran
 6-Refah Bank
 7-Tejarat Bank
 8-Bank Mellat
 9-Bank of Industry and Mine
 10-Export Development Bank of Iran
 11-Karafarin Bank
 12-EN Bank
 13-Parsian Bank
 14-Saman Bank
 15-Bank Pasargad
 16-Sarmayeh Bank
 17-Post Bank of Iran
 18-Sina Bank
 19-Qarz Al-Hasaneh Mehr Iran Bank
 20-Tose'e-Ta'avon Bank
 21-Bank Shahr
 22-Bank Day
 23-Tourism Bank
 24-Iran Zamin Bank
 25-Ayandeh Bank
 26-Qarz Al-Hasaneh Resalat Bank
 27-Middle East Bank

Impact

As of 2006, Iran was still very much a cash based society. It is expected that a unified clearance system, such as Shetab, will provide significantly greater efficiency, reduce crime, reduce money printing costs, and improve tax collection among other benefits. It is also expected to improve the quality of life of citizens whom, once the system is fully operational, would no longer be required to spend significant amounts of time organizing things in person and would consequently be able to conduct activities immediately over the phone or over the internet. The impact of the system is already being felt as corporations establish e-commerce, supply chains, online banking and retailing systems.

See also

 Iranian rial
 Communications in Iran
 Economy of Iran
 ATM usage fees
 List of banks in Iran
 International rankings of Iran

References

External links
 Annual Reviews - Reports by the Central Bank of Iran, including Shetab and electronic banking statistics.
 Iran-Daily: Banking Reforms (Press article)

Banking in Iran
Communications in Iran
Financial services companies of Iran
Interbank networks